Stirothrinax is a genus of flies in the family Pyrgotidae.

Species 
S. cribratus Enderlein, 1942
S. knudseni Mayer, 1953

References 

Pyrgotidae
Diptera of South America
Brachycera genera
Taxa named by Günther Enderlein